The Greece Denmark Billie Jean King Cup team represents Greece in Denmark Billie Jean King Cup tennis competition and are governed by the Hellenic Tennis Federation.  They currently compete in the Europe/Africa Zone of Group I.

History
Greece competed in its first Fed Cup in 1968. Their best result was reaching the round of 16 in 1977 and 1984. 

Their current team is: Maria Sakkari, Valentini Grammatikopoulou, Eleni Kordolaimi,  Despina Papamichail and Emmanouela Antonakis.  

Past players include: Eleni Daniilidou, Anna Koumantou, Christína Papadáki, Christina Zachariadou, Olga Tsarbopoulou, Angelika Kanellopoulou and Carol-Ann Kalogeropoulos. 

Denise Panagopoulou of Greece holds the record for the youngest player that ever competed in the Fed Cup.  In 1977, she played at the age of 12 and 360 days.

See also
Fed Cup
Greece Davis Cup team

External source

Billie Jean King Cup teams
Fed Cup
Fed Cup